Britannia was launched at Kirkcaldy in 1798. she spent her career as a West Indiaman. In 1807 a French privateer captured her, but the British Royal Navy recaptured her the next day. Finally, an American privateer captured her in October 1812.

Career
Britannia entered Lloyd's Register (LR) in 1799. The entry simply gave her origin as Scotland.

On 16 February 1807 a French privateer of three guns and 70 men captured Britannia, Gibbs, master, which was sailing from London to Jamaica. The next day  recaptured Britannia and sent her into Barbados.

Fate
On 3 September 1812 the United States privateer Wily Renard captured Britannia, of Portsmouth, Edington, master.

 encountered and subsequently captured Wily Reynard on 11 October and took her to Halifax, Nova Scotia.

Notes, Citations, and references
Notes

Citations

References
 Brighton, John George, & Sir Philip Bowes Vere Broke (1866) Admiral Sir P. B. V. Broke ...: A Memoir. (S. Low, son, and Marston)
 

1798 ships
Age of Sail merchant ships of England
Captured ships